1979 in philosophy

Events 
Hegel Society of Great Britain was founded in 1979.

Publications
 Peter Singer, Practical Ethics (1979)
 Amartya Sen, Equality of What?  (The Tanner Lectures on Human Values)
 Dreyfus, Hubert, What Computers Can't Do: The Limits of Artificial Intelligence, 2nd ed. (First ed., 1972)
 Fodor, Jerry, Representations: Essays on the Foundations of Cognitive Science, Harvard Press (UK) and MIT Press (US)
 Hofstadter, Douglas, Gödel, Escher, Bach: an Eternal Golden Braid. Basic Books. (Won Pulitzer Prize in 1980.)
 Kripke, Saul, "A Puzzle about Belief", In: Meaning and Use, edited by A. Margalit. Dordrecht and Boston: Reidel.
 Lewis, David, "Prisoners' Dilemma is a Newcomb Problem," Philosophy and Public Affairs, 8, pp 235–40.
 Lewis, David, "Counterfactual Dependence and Time's Arrow," Nous, 13, pp 455–76.
 Lewis, David, "Scorekeeping in a Language Game," Journal of Philosophical Logic, 8, pp 339–59.
 Lewis, David, "Attitude De Dicto and De Se," Philosophical Review, 88, pp 513–43.
 Lewis, David, "Lucas against Mechanism II," Canadian Journal of Philosophy, 9, pp 373–76.
 Marquard, Odo, "In Praise of Polytheism", in Hans Poser, ed., Philosophie und Mythos. Ein Kolloquium (de Gruyter, Berlin and New York), pp. 40–58
 McDowell, John, "Virtue and Reason," The Monist, lxii, 331–50; reprinted in Stanley G. Clarke and Evan Simpson, eds., Anti-Theory in Ethics and Moral Conservatism (SUNY Press, Albany, 1989), pp. 87–109
 Ortony, Andrew (ed.), Metaphor and Thought, Cambridge: Cambridge University Press (Note: Some authors and contents may not have originated in 1979, but included in the revised edition in 1993.)
 Metaphor, language and thought, Andrew Ortony
 More about metaphor, Max Black
 Part I. Metaphor and Meaning
 Figurative speech and linguistics, Jerrold M. Saddock
 The semantics of metaphor, L. Jonathan Cohen
 Some problems with the notion of literal meanings, David E. Rumelhart
 Metaphor, John R. Searle
 Language, concepts, and worlds: Three domains of metaphor, Samuel R. Levin
 Observations on the pragmatics of metaphor, Jerry L. Morgan
 Part II. Metaphor and Representation
 Generative metaphor: A perspective on problem-setting in social policy, Donald A. Schön
 The conduit metaphor: A case of frame conflict in our language about language, Michael J. Reddy
 The contemporary theory of metaphor, George Lakoff
 Process and products in making sense of tropes, Raymond W. Gibbs, Jr.
 Metaphor, induction, and social policy: The Convergence of macroscopic and microscopic views, Robert J. Sternberg and Roger Tourangeau
 Part III. Metaphor and Understanding
 Psychological processes in metaphor comprehension and memory, Allan Paivio and Mary Walsh
 The interpretation of novel metaphors, Bruce Fraser
 The role of similarity in similes and metaphors, Andrew Ortony
 Images and models, Similes and Metaphors, George A. Miller
 How Metaphors Work, Sam Glucksberg and Boaz Keysar
 Metaphor and irony: two levels of understanding, Ellen Winner and Howard Gardner
 Part IV. Metaphor and Science
 The shift from metaphor to analogy in western science, Dedre Gentner and Michael Jeziorski
 Metaphor and theory change: What is ‘metaphor’ a metaphor for? Richard Boyd
 Metaphor in science, Thomas S. Kuhn
 Metaphorical imprecision and the ‘top-down’ research strategy, Zenon W. Pylyshyn
 Part V. Metaphor and Education
 The instructive metaphor: metaphoric aids to students’ understanding of science, Richard E. Mayer
 Metaphor and learning, Hugh G. Petrie and Rebecca S. Oshlag
 Learning without metaphor, Thomas F. Green
 Educational uses of metaphor, Thomas G. Sticht
 Osgood, Charles E., Focus on Meaning: Explorations in Semantic Space. Mouton Publishers.
 Osgood, Charles E., "What is a Language?" In: Aaronson, D. & Rieber, R. (eds.) Psycholinguistic Research: Implications and Applications. Hillsdale, N.J.: Erlbaum. pp. 189–228.
 Perry, John, "The Problem of the Essential Indexical." Noûs 13, no. 1: 3 – 21.
 Popper, Karl, Objective Knowledge: An Evolutionary Approach, Rev. ed. (First ed., 1972)
 Rorty, Richard, Philosophy and the Mirror of Nature
 Searle, John, Expression and Meaning
 Introduction
 Origins of the essays
 1. A taxonomy of illocutionary acts
 2. Indirect speech acts
 3. The logical status of fictional discourse
 4. Metaphor
 5. Literal meaning
 6. Referential and attributive
 7. Speech acts and recent linguistics
 Hans Jonas, The Imperative of Responsibility (1979)
 James Lovelock, Gaia: A New Look at Life on Earth (1979)
 Hans Albert, Das Elend der Theologie (in German, not yet translated into English; 1979)
 Jean-Francois Lyotard, The Postmodern Condition (1979)
 Leo Bersani, Baudelaire and Freud (1979)

Births 
 September 22 - Roberto Saviano

Deaths 
 January 15 - Charles W. Morris (born 1901)
 March 14 - Charles Stevenson (born 1908)
 March 16 - Jean Monnet (born 1888)
 May 8 - Talcott Parsons (born 1902)
 July 29 - Herbert Marcuse (born 1898)
 September 7 - I. A. Richards (born 1893)
 Paul Schatz (unspecified)

References 

Philosophy
20th-century philosophy
Philosophy by year